The seventh edition of the South American Championship was held in Montevideo, Uruguay from 29 October to 2 December 1923.

Overview

The participating countries were Argentina, Brazil, Paraguay and Uruguay. Chile withdrew for the second time since the tournament was created.

The tournament was also used as a qualifier for the 1924 Summer Olympics.

Squads
For a complete list of participants squads see: 1923 South American Championship squads

Venues

Final round
Each team played one match against each of the other teams. Two points were awarded for a win, one point for a draw and zero points for a defeat.

Result

Goal scorers

3 goals

  Vicente Aguirre
  Pedro Petrone

2 goals

  Blas Saruppo
  Nilo

1 goals

  Cesáreo Onzari
  Luis Fretes
  Ildefonso López
  Gerardo Rivas
  Agustín Zelada
  José Cea
  Héctor Scarone
  Pascual Somma

External links
 South American Championship 1923 at RSSSF

 
1923
1923
1923 in South American football
1923 in Brazilian football
1923 in Argentine football
1923 in Uruguayan football
1923 in Paraguayan football
Football at the 1924 Summer Olympics
Football qualification for the Summer Olympics
October 1923 sports events
November 1923 sports events
December 1923 sports events
Sports competitions in Montevideo
1920s in Montevideo